Synthetic-music mobile application format, abbreviated SMAF, is a music data format specified by Yamaha for portable electronic devices, such as cell phones and PDAs. The file extension for SMAF is .MMF and is common as ringtones for mobile phones with one of five sound chips.

SMAF resembles MIDI, but also supports graphics and PCM sound playback. Its MIDI playback is produced via FM synthesis or PCM sample-based synthesis, where instrument data (parameters and/or PCM samples) is stored within the .MMF file itself, similar to module files. This enables users to create custom instruments, which will sound exactly the same on devices with the same chip.

The feature set used in SMAF files usually orients itself at the chips produced by Yamaha for playback:

External links
Yamaha's SMAF Website
SMAF Specifications

Music notation file formats